Vybor is the name of several rural localities in Russia:
Vybor, Leningrad Oblast, a village in Zaklinskoye Settlement Municipal Formation of Luzhsky District of Leningrad Oblast
Vybor, Pskov Oblast, a village in Novorzhevsky District of Pskov Oblast
Vybor, Tver Oblast, a village in Vesyegonsky District of Tver Oblast